Khalid Al-Harbi (born 10 July 1975) is a Saudi Arabian table tennis player. He competed in the 2004 Summer Olympics.

References

1975 births
Living people
Saudi Arabian male table tennis players
Table tennis players at the 2004 Summer Olympics
Table tennis players at the 2010 Asian Games
Olympic table tennis players of Saudi Arabia
Asian Games competitors for Saudi Arabia
20th-century Saudi Arabian people
21st-century Saudi Arabian people